The Catholic Diocese of Fort Worth in the United States was established on August 9, 1969, after being part of the Diocese of Dallas for 79 years. At present, the diocese has more than 1,200,000 Catholics in 92 parishes, served by 132 priests, 106 deacons, and 48 sisters.  It is made up of 28 counties of North Central Texas: Archer, Baylor, Bosque, Clay, Comanche, Cooke, Denton, Eastland, Erath, Foard, Hardeman, Hill, Hood, Jack, Johnson, Knox, Montague, Palo Pinto, Parker, Shackelford, Somervell, Stephens, Tarrant, Throckmorton, Wichita, Wilbarger, Wise, and Young with a total area of 23,950 mi2.

History 
In 1890 the Catholic population of the area of the Brazos and Trinity rivers had grown large enough that Pope Leo XIII established the Diocese of Dallas. As early as 1870 Claude Marie Dubuis, the second bishop of the Diocese of Galveston (which diocese encompassed all of Texas at that time), had begun sending Father Vincent Perrier twice a year to visit Fort Worth. At that time several Catholic families were meeting in the Carrico home. Fort Worth's first parish church was a frame structure built at 1212 Throckmorton Street and called St. Stanislaus Church. It stood until 1907. The cornerstone of St. Patrick's Church, which eventually became St. Patrick Cathedral, was laid in 1888; the church was built just north of St. Stanislaus Church and dedicated in 1892. When Dallas was made a diocese the region that eventually became the Diocese of Fort Worth had seven parishes – Fort Worth, Cleburne, Gainesville, Henrietta, Hillsboro, Muenster, and Weatherford.

The decade of the 1870s witnessed the earliest Catholic education in the area. In 1879 Father Thomas Loughrey, pastor of St. Stanislaus Church, opened a boys' school that operated in the church until 1907. In 1885 the Sisters of Saint Mary of Namur established Saint Ignatius Academy in Fort Worth and Xavier Academy in Denison. In 1910 the same religious institute founded Fort Worth's first Catholic college, Our Lady of Victory College. Other Catholic schools opened in Denton (1874) Weatherford (1880), Muenster (1890 and 1895), Gainesville (1892), Pilot Point (1893), and Cleburne (1896). St. Joseph's Infirmary (now St. Joseph's Hospital) opened in 1885 in Fort Worth.

In 1953 Pope Pius XII changed the name of the Diocese of Dallas to Diocese of Dallas–Fort Worth, and Saint Patrick's Church in Fort Worth was elevated to the status of a co-cathedral. In 1985 St. Patrick Cathedral, St. Ignatius Church, and the St. Ignatius rectory were added to the National Register of Historic Places.

On August 22, 1969, Pope Paul VI separated 28 counties of north central Texas from the Catholic Diocese of Dallas–Fort Worth to form the Diocese of Fort Worth (the remaining territory went back to the "Diocese of Dallas" designation). Two months later, on October 21, Bishop John J. Cassata, a native of Galveston, was installed in St. Patrick Cathedral as Fort Worth's first ordinary. From 1969, when the Diocese of Fort Worth was established, to 1986 the Catholic population increased from 67,000 to 120,000. Meanwhile, in 1981 Bishop Cassata retired, and Pope John Paul II named as his successor a native of Massachusetts who had previously worked in Brownsville, Bishop Joseph P. Delaney.

Under Bishop Delaney the diocese continued to mature. In 1986, it had fourteen primary schools, three secondary schools, the Cassata Learning Center (dedicated in 1975 as an institution offering nontraditional, personalized instruction to the underprivileged of Fort Worth), and a new Catholic Center. The center, a  edifice, brought together under one roof all of the pastoral and administrative offices of the diocese. Guided by Bishop Delaney, the diocese continued to underscore the principles of the Second Vatican Council, especially a commitment to the poor, to ecumenism, and to an increased role in the church for the laity. In May 2005, Pope Benedict XVI appointed Msgr. Kevin Vann as coadjutor bishop. A coadjutor bishop has right of succession upon the death or retirement of a bishop. On July 12, 2005, Bishop Delaney was found dead at his home, apparently passing away in his sleep. On July 13, 2005, Kevin Vann was consecrated bishop as previously scheduled and, because of Bishop Delaney's death, immediately assumed the cathedra of the Diocese.

Bishop Vann was installed as the Bishop of Orange on December 10, 2012.

On November 19, 2013, Pope Francis named Msgr. Michael F. Olson as the fourth bishop of Fort Worth. He was consecrated and installed on January 29, 2014.

On May 24, 2021, 6 men were ordained priest by Bishop Olson at Vietnamese Martyrs Church in Arlington. This was the largest priestly ordination class ever in the diocese history at that point.

Bishops

Bishops of Fort Worth
List of bishops and their tenures of service:
 John Joseph Cassata (1969–1980)
 Joseph Patrick Delaney (1981–2005)
 Kevin William Vann (2005–2012), appointed Bishop of Orange
 Michael Fors Olson (2013–present)

Coadjutor bishop
Kevin William Vann (2005), but wasn't consecrated as such before Bishop Delaney died, so became bishop of the diocese immediately upon consecration

Other priest of this diocese who became bishop
 Stephen Jay Berg, appointed Bishop of Pueblo in 2014

Churches

Cathedral
St. Patrick Cathedral

Parishes

Education

 University and college communities
 University Catholic Community University of Texas at Arlington
 Catholic Campus Center  Midwestern State University
 St. John Paul II Parish University of North Texas, Texas Woman's University
 TCU Catholic Texas Christian University
 Catholic Campus Ministry Tarleton State University

 High schools
 Cassata Catholic High School, Fort Worth
 Nolan Catholic High School, Fort Worth
 Sacred Heart Catholic School, Muenster

See also

 Catholic Church by country
 Catholic Church in the United States
 Ecclesiastical Province of San Antonio
 Global organisation of the Catholic Church
 List of Catholic archdioceses (by country and continent)
 List of Catholic dioceses (alphabetical) (including archdioceses)
 List of Catholic dioceses (structured view) (including archdioceses)
 List of Catholic dioceses in the United States

References

External links
Catholic Diocese of Fort Worth Official Site
Map of every Catholic church in the Fort Worth Diocese 

Fort Worth
Roman Catholic Ecclesiastical Province of San Antonio
Christian organizations established in 1969
Organizations based in Fort Worth, Texas
Fort Worth
1969 establishments in Texas